Jamaica Dockyard also known as Port Royal Dockyard  was a British Royal Navy Dockyard located at Port Royal, Jamaica. It was established 1675 and closed in 1905. The dockyard was initially administered by the Navy Board then later the Board of Admiralty.

History
In 1675 the British first made use of a wharf at Port Royal and assigned a resident Naval Officer to superintend these facilities;. Following the 1692 earthquake, Port Royal never fully recovered from its preeminent position as a major commercial center. Despite this the dockyard served as the headquarters of the British Royal Navy in the Caribbean.  From the eighteenth century until the nineteenth century, various refurbishments and upgrade work were undertaken to improve its docks, facilities fortifications and. From 1735 new wharves and storehouses were built at this time, as well as housing for the officers of the Yard. Over the next thirty years, more facilities were added: cooperages, workshops, sawpits, and accommodation (including a canteen) for the crews of ships being careened there. by the end of the 18th century, a small Victualling Yard had been added to the east of the yard, prior to this ships had had to go to Kingston and other settlements to take on supplies) and in 1817 a Royal Naval Hospital was constructed the west of the yard. The dockyard and continued to be an important naval base until 1905 when it was closed. .

The dockyard was first administered by the Navy Board and later Board of Admiralty until 1869 after which it was administered as part of the Department of the Director Dockyards of the Admiralty. It was a component part of the Jamaica Station until 1830 then finally part of North America and West Indies Station until 1905.

Administration of the dockyard and other key officials

The Master Shipwright was usually the key official at the royal navy dockyards until the introduction of resident commissioners by the Navy Board who were responsible for administrating naval yards; after which he became deputy to the resident commissioner. In 1832 the post of commissioner was usually replaced by the post of admiral superintendent. However, the commissioner was replaced later by a Commodore-in-Charge, Jamaica.

Superintendent, Jamaica Dockyard
Post holders included:
 1724–1727, John Potter

Resident Commissioner of the Navy, Jamaica
Post holders included:
 1782–1784, Captain Alexander Lambert.
 1814–1820, Captain Daniel Woodriffe. 
 1825–1827, Captain Thomas George Shortland.
 1827–1828, Captain Charles Inglis.
 1828–1832,  Captain Thomas George Shortland.

Commodore in Charge, Naval Establishments Jamaica
Included:
 1838–1839, Commodore, Sir John Strutt Peyton.
 1839–1842, Commodore, Sir Peter John Douglas.
 1842–1843, Commodore, Hon. Henry Dilkes Byng.
 1843–1845, Commodore, Alexander Renton Sharpe.
 1845–1847, Commodore, Daniel Pring.
 1848–1851, Commodore, Thomas Bennett.
 1854–1855, Commodore, Thomas Henderson.
 1855–1857, Commodore, Henry Kellett.
 1859–1864, Commodore, Hugh Dunlop.
 1864–1865, Commodore, Peter Cracroft.  
 1865, Acting Commodore, Algernon F.R. de Horsey.
 1865–1868, Commodore, F. Leopold McClintock.
 1868–1869, Commodore, Augustus Phillimore.
 1869–1872, Commodore, Richard W. Courtenay.
 1872–1875, Commodore, Algernon F.R. de Horsey.
 1875–1878, Commodore, Algernon McLennan Lyons.
 1878–1880, Commodore, Hon. William John Ward.
 1880–1882, Commodore, William Samuel Brown (Greive).
 1882, Mar-Aug, Commodore, Edward White.
 1883–1886, Commodore, Francis Mowbray Prattent.
 1886–1889, Commodore, Henry Hand.
 1889–1892, Commodore, Rodney M. Lloyd
 1892–1895, Commodore, Thomas S. Jackson.
 1895–1898, Commodore, Herbert W. Dowding.
 1898–1900, Commodore, William H. Henderson.
 1900–1901, Commodore, Edward H. M. Davis.
 1901–1904, Commodore Daniel McNab Riddel.
 1904–1905, Commodore Frederick. W, Fisher.

Master Shipwright, Jamaica
Post holders included:
 1734–1739, James Croucher.
 1739–1744, George Wales.
 1744–1747, Thomas Aldersone.
 1747–1748, Russel Tompkins.
 1748–1754, Jonathon Bowden. 
 1754–1762, William Jerney.
 1762–1776, Lionel Beal.
 1776–1780, John North.
 1780–1784, Alexander Innes.
 1784–1793, John Bignall
 1793–1794, James Smith
 1814–1820, George Spiller.  
 1820–1827, John Taff.  
 1827–1828, George Hunter.

Master Attendant, Jamaica
Post holders included:
 1728–1731, James Patterson  
 1731–1740, John Cock  
 1779, William Forfar 
 1814-1820 Francis Owen. 
 1820–1825,  William Oliver.
 1825–1828, William White.
 1901–1905, Henry H. Hatchard

Storekeeper, Jamaica
Post holders included:
 1727–1729, John Potter.
 1729 Aug-Sep, Nathaniel Shepherd.
 1729–1736, Edward Chiles.
 1736–1745, George Hinde
 1745–1747, William Campbell.
 1747–1750, Mathew Wallen.
 1750/-1770, John Patterson.
 1770–1775, James Burnett.
 1775–1780, Samuel Holman.
 1780, Robert Allen.

Naval Storekeeper, Jamaica
Included:
 1730–1739, Warner Tempest 
 1814–1820, A. N. Yates.  
 1820–1825, Charles H. Smith.
 1825–1828, Peter Mitch Magnan.

Naval and Victualling Store Officer
Included:
 1903–1905, J. H. Aitken Esq.

Chief Engineer, Jamaica
Included:
 1903–1905, Engineer Lieutenant, Victor E. Snook.

References

Sources
 Archives, National (1708–1802). "Royal Naval dockyard staff: Port Royal Dockyard, Jamaica". The National Archives. London, England: The National Archives.
 Coad, Jonathan (2013). Support for the Fleet: architecture and engineering of the Royal Navy's bases 1700–1914. Swindon: English Heritage 
 Clowes, Sir William Laird (1897–1903). The royal navy, a history from the earliest times to the present Volume III (1763-1792). London, England: S. Low Marston.
 Cundall, Frank (1915). Historic Jamaica : With fifty-two illustrations. England: London : Published for the Institute of Jamaica by the West India Committee.
 Harley, Simon; Lovell, Tony (2018). "Jamaica - The Dreadnought Project". dreadnoughtproject.org. Harley and Lovell.
 Harrison, Simon; (2010-2018), Jamaica Dockyard. https://threedecks.org.
 Mackie, Colin. (2019), "Royal Navy Senior Appointments from 1865: Commodore, Jamaica". gulabin.com. Colin Mackie.
 Office, Admiralty (December 1814). The Navy List. London, England: John Murray.
 Office, Admiralty (January 1820). The Navy List. London, England: John Murray. 
 Office, Admiralty (December 1827). The Navy List. London, England: John Murray. 
 Office, Admiralty (March 1828). The Navy List. London, England: John Murray.

 

Royal Navy dockyards
Jamaica